Yongji is a county-level city in the prefecture-level city of Yuncheng, in the southwest of Shanxi province, China, bordering Shaanxi province to the west.

According to a census in 2011, the population in Yongji was 446,000.

Climate

References

 
Cities in Shanxi
County-level divisions of Shanxi